The Kirkhaugh cairns are two, or possibly three, Bronze Age burials located in Kirkhaugh, Northumberland. The two confirmed graves were excavated in 1935 and re-excavated in 2014. The first grave, dubbed Cairn 1, contained grave goods consistent with a high-status metalworker. These included two of the earliest gold ornaments, and one of the earliest bell beakers, known in Britain.  The second grave was empty.

Excavation 

The Kirkhaugh cairns were excavated over five days in 1935 by Herbert Maryon. Then master of sculpture at Durham University's Armstrong College, Maryon was interested in archaeology and frequently excavated sites with his students. He was assisted by Joseph William Alderson at Kirkhaugh, carrying out the excavation on 18–21 September, and on 12 October.

Upon removal of the turf from the first mound, Maryon found what he described as "a continuous layer of flattish stones" underneath. These were piled on top of each other, and varied in size from several inches in length to two feet; the larger stones weighed between 50 and 100 pounds. Beneath the stones was a mixture of light earth and small stones. No body was found, but near the centre of the cairn, where a body might have been placed, were patches of greasy clay on the rock surface. Also in the centre were found the majority of the grave goods. Maryon described these as a crushed food vessel; "1 gold ear-ring"; "1 flint arrowhead"; "1 flint saw"; "6 worked flakes of flint" ; "2 flint cores, and a number of unworked flakes"; "1 whetstone, or hone"; "1 coarse rubber of sandstone"; "1 rough nodule of glazed ware"; "1 vase or mug handle"; and "a fragment of coarse pottery, a nodule of iron pyrites, and some pieces of charcoal." With the exception of the food vessel, found about four and a half feet from the centre, and some of the charcoal, all of the finds were in the central area about three or four feet in diameter.

The crushed food vessel identified by Maryon has subsequently been termed a bell beaker, and as one of, or perhaps the, earliest type yet found in Britain. What Maryon termed an earring has also been re-identified, as a hair braid; it is one of the oldest metal objects found in the country. In 2014, during a re-excavation of the cairns using community volunteers, four boys—two of whom were great-grandsons of Alderson—discovered a matching hair braid.

References

Notes

Bibliography 
  
 
 
 
  
  
  
 
  
  
  
  
  
  
  
  
  
 
 
 
  
  
  

History of Northumberland
Bronze Age England